Young Guns are an English rock band from Buckinghamshire and London. On 22 June 2009 they released their debut EP Mirrors, and their debut album All Our Kings Are Dead was released a year later on 12 July 2010. Their second album, Bones, was released in February 2012. Their third studio album, Ones and Zeros, was released in June 2015, and their fourth, Echoes, was released in September 2016.

Studio albums

EPs

Singles

Music videos

References 

Discographies of British artists
Rock music group discographies